General elections were held in Malta on 5 and 6 September 1892. Elections were only held in three constituencies as all other members were returned unopposed.

Background
The elections were held under the Knutsford Constitution. Ten members were elected from single-member constituencies, whilst a further four members were elected to represent nobility and landowners, graduates, clerics and the Chamber of Commerce.

Results
A total of 10,522 people were registered to vote, of which just 1,062 cast votes, giving a turnout of 10%.

References

1892
Malta
1892 in Malta
September 1892 events